Fort Gratiot  was an American stockade fort in Fort Gratiot, Michigan, in Saint Clair County, Michigan. The former location of the fort was listed on the National Register of Historic Places in 1980.

History
The Army constructed Fort Gratiot in 1814 as an outpost to guard the juncture of the Saint Clair River and Lake Huron.  The fort took the name of the engineer supervising its construction, Charles Gratiot. Soldiers occupied Fort Gratiot until 1822 and then abandoned the fort.  Lucius Lyon built Fort Gratiot Light north of Fort Gratiot in 1825–1829.  

The Army then returned from 1828, and rebuilt the fort to a somewhat smaller size than the original, also building some timber-framed structures on the site, including a hospital and officer's quarters. The site was used intermittently until 1879.

The Army abandoned Fort Gratiot in 1879.  It was not entirely shut down until 1895.

Pine Grove Park occupies part of the fort site.  The timber-framed hospital and officers quarters were moved multiple times within the fort, finally being placed in the western section, along what is now St. Claire Street. In the 1980s, archaeological work determined the age of the structures, and in 2000–02, the Port Huron Museum acquired both homes and moved them to a lot in Lighthouse Park, where the Fort Gratiot Lighthouse is located. Restoration began in 2012.

Description
The original fort was constructed entirely of wood. Logs formed the base, with piled earth and upright timbers forming a stockade.  The fort was approximately 165 wide feet by 495 feet long.  It likely had a two-story blockhouse.

Gallery

References

External links
 Fort Gratiot Lighthouse
  American Forts, East, Michigan, Fort Gratiot
 fortgratiot.us

Gratiot
Gratiot
Buildings and structures in St. Clair County, Michigan
Military history of Michigan
Military history of the Great Lakes
Pre-statehood history of Michigan
1814 establishments in Michigan Territory